Halfset were an Irish electronica/post-rock band based in Dublin.

Career
Halfset's second album, Another Way of Being There (2008), was nominated for the Choice Music Prize, earning comparisons to Sigur Rós, Mogwai and Tortoise. Halfset performed at Electric Picnic 2009.

By 2015 the band had disbanded.

Personnel

 Stephen Shannon (producer/engineer, laptop, bass)
 Jeff Martin (guitar, vocals)
 Sinéad Nic Gearailt (harp, Rhodes piano)
 Cillian McDonnell (drums)

Discography

Albums
Dramanalog (2005)
Another Way of Being There (2008)

References

External links 
 Halfset on Discogs
Halfset on Bandcamp

Musical groups from Dublin (city)
Irish post-rock groups
2005 establishments in Ireland